Henry Thomas Mayo (8 December 1856 – 23 February 1937) was an admiral of the United States Navy.

Mayo was born in Burlington, Vermont, 8 December 1856. Upon graduation from the United States Naval Academy in 1876 he experienced a variety of naval duties including coastal survey.

Capt. Mayo commanded Mare Island Naval Shipyard in 1903, before becoming the aide for the Secretary of the Navy Josephus Daniels.  He then attended the Naval War College before reassignment to a squadron.

About 1909 he was in command of the cruiser  as she cruised in Central American waters protecting United States citizens and interests as part of the Special Service Squadron.

Appointed rear admiral in 1913, he commanded the naval squadron involved in the Tampico incident of 9 April 1914. His demands for vindication of national honor further accentuated the tense relations with Mexico.

Promoted to vice admiral in June 1915, as the new Commander in Chief, Atlantic Fleet, he received the rank of admiral 19 June 1916. For his organization and support of World War I U.S. Naval Forces both in American and European waters, he was awarded the Navy Distinguished Service Medal and various foreign decorations. He evidenced foresight in urging the postwar development of fleet aviation.

Admiral Mayo retired 28 February 1921, and, for four years, served as Governor of the Philadelphia Naval Home. He retained his commission as an admiral by a 1930 Act of Congress. He died at Portsmouth, New Hampshire, 23 February 1937.

Awards
 Distinguished Service Medal
 Navy Expeditionary Medal
 Spanish Campaign Medal
 Victory Medal

Namesake
In 1940, the destroyer  was named in his honor.

See also

References

1937 deaths
1856 births
United States Navy admirals
United States Naval Academy alumni
United States Navy personnel of the Spanish–American War
United States Navy personnel of World War I
Admirals of World War I
American military personnel of the Banana Wars
People from Burlington, Vermont
Recipients of the Navy Distinguished Service Medal
Burials at Lakeview Cemetery (Burlington, Vermont)